Tafa Air was a failed low-cost airline project based in Tirana, Albania, focusing on Albanians living abroad (mostly in Germany). The airline was set up by Albanian businessman Taf Tafa and was supported by Albanian and Kosovan shareholders. Services commenced on 18 December 2009, with scheduled flights out of Tirana International Airport and Pristina International Airport to Athens International Airport.

In early February 2010, Tafa Air was forced to suspend operations again, when Lithuanian airline flyLAL Charters discontinued the  aircraft lease contract that provided Tafa Air with its only airplane. Tafa originally announced it would restart services in late March or early April of the same year, but the company has dissolved since then.

Fleet
Tafa Air operated its flights using a leased Boeing 737-300.

See also 
 List of defunct airlines of Albania

References

External links
  via Wayback Machine

Defunct airlines of Albania
Defunct European low-cost airlines
Airlines established in 2009
Airlines disestablished in 2010
2009 establishments in Albania
2010 disestablishments in Albania